The 2019–20 La Liga season, also known as LaLiga Santander for sponsorship reasons, was the 89th since its establishment. The season began on 16 August 2019 and was originally scheduled to conclude on 24 May 2020.

Barcelona were the two-time defending champions, after winning their 26th title in the previous season. Osasuna, Granada and Mallorca joined as the promoted clubs from the 2018–19 Segunda División. They replaced Rayo Vallecano, Huesca and Girona, who were relegated to the 2019–20 Segunda División.

On 12 March 2020, both La Liga and the Segunda División were suspended for at least two weeks due to the COVID-19 pandemic. The league became suspended indefinitely on 23 March. The season recommenced on 11 June, with matches being played every single day until 13 July; all games in the penultimate round were held on 16 July, with all final round matches being played on 19 July. 

On 16 July, Real Madrid secured a record-extending 34th league title with one match remaining, following their victory against Villarreal.

Teams

Promotion and relegation (pre-season)
A total of 20 teams contested the league, including 17 sides from the 2018–19 season and three promoted from the 2018–19 Segunda División. This included the two top teams from the Segunda División, and the winners of the play-offs.

Teams relegated to Segunda Division

The first team to be relegated from La Liga were Rayo Vallecano. Their relegation was ensured on 5 May 2019, after Valladolid beat Athletic Bilbao 1−0, suffering an immediate return to the Segunda División. The second team to be relegated were Huesca, who were also relegated on 5 May 2019 after a 2−6 home defeat to Valencia, also suffering an immediate return to the second tier. The third and final relegated club were Girona, who concluded their two-year stay in La Liga in a 1−2 away loss at Alavés on 18 May 2019.

Teams promoted from Segunda División

Osasuna (on 20 May 2019) and Granada (on 4 June 2019) were the two teams directly promoted from Segunda División, both after a two-year absence. The third and final team to earn promotion to La Liga was play-offs winner Mallorca, after coming back from a 2-goal deficit against Deportivo La Coruña on 23 June 2019. Mallorca returned after a six-year absence from Spain's top flight, spending one of those years in the Segunda División B and achieving two consecutive promotions.

Stadiums and locations

Personnel and sponsorship

1. On the back of shirt.
2. On the sleeves.
3. On the shorts.

Managerial changes

League table

Standings

Results

Season statistics

Scoring
First goal of the season:  Aritz Aduriz for Athletic Bilbao against Barcelona (16 August 2019)
Last goal of the season:  Coke for Levante against Getafe (19 July 2020)

Top goalscorers

Zamora Trophy
The Zamora Trophy is awarded by newspaper Marca to the goalkeeper with the lowest goals-to-games ratio. A goalkeeper had to have played at least 28 games of 60 or more minutes to be eligible for the trophy.

Hat-tricks

4 – Player scored four goals.

Discipline

Player
 Most yellow cards: 15
 Gerard Piqué (Barcelona)
 Damián Suárez (Getafe)
 Most red cards: 2
  Zouhair Feddal (Real Betis)
  Nabil Fekir (Real Betis)
  Lee Kang-in (Valencia)
  Clément Lenglet (Barcelona)
  Allan Nyom (Getafe)
  Facundo Roncaglia (Osasuna)

Team
 Most yellow cards: 130
 Getafe
 Most red cards: 9
 Espanyol
 Real Betis
 Fewest yellow cards: 71
 Levante
 Fewest red cards: 0
 Valladolid

Match ball
On 15 April 2019, Puma announced their official partnership with La Liga to manufacture the official match ball for the Liga de Fútbol Profesional. This ended La Liga's 23-year partnership with Nike.

Average attendances 
Matches played under closed doors are not included in the table.

Awards

Monthly

Number of teams by autonomous community

Notes

References

 
2019-20
Spain
1
La Liga